Cyclochlamydidae is a family of bivalves belonging to the order Pectinida.

Genera:
 Chlamydella Iredale, 1929
 Cyclochlamys Finlay, 1926
 Micropecten Dijkstra & Maestrati, 2012

References

 Dijkstra H.H. & Maestrati P. (2012) Pectinoidea (Mollusca, Bivalvia, Propeamussiidae, Cyclochlamydidae n. fam., Entoliidae and Pectinidae) from the Vanuatu Archipelago. Zoosystema 34(2): 389-408

Pectinida
Bivalve families